Mast Hashimu Garba (born 14 April 1980) is a Nigerian former professional footballer who played as a forward. He spent most of his career in Italy

Playing career
In 1997, Garba signed for Italian second division side Padova, but left after the president cast lots to decide who to release, between him and fellow Nigerian Mohammed Aliyu Datti, due to Padova having already filled their quota of non-EU players.

In 1998, Garba signed for A.C. ChievoVerona in the Italian second division, where he made three league appearances.

He competed for Nigeria at the 1999 FIFA World Youth Championship.

In 2000, Garba signed for Italian second division club Pistoiese, where he made four league appearances and scored one goal.

Before the second half of the 2000–01 season, Garba was sent on loan to Winterthur in Switzerland, where he made 14 league appearances and scored five goals.

Before the second half of the 2001–02 season, he signed for Italian third division team Martina.

In 2008, Garba signed for Copparese in the Italian lower leagues.

Post-playing career
In 2019, Garba was appointed team manager of Nigerian outfit Wikki Tourists.

References

External links
 
 

1980 births
Living people
Serie B players
Nigerian footballers
Association football forwards
Nigeria youth international footballers
Serie C players
Calcio Padova players
A.C. ChievoVerona players
U.S. Pistoiese 1921 players
Imolese Calcio 1919 players
Alma Juventus Fano 1906 players
Latina Calcio 1932 players
S.P.A.L. players
A.C. Sansovino players
A.S.D. Martina Calcio 1947 players
Nigerian expatriate footballers
Nigerian expatriate sportspeople in Italy
Expatriate footballers in Italy
People from Bauchi State